John Edward Brewer Jr. (August 26, 1928 – July 28, 1983) was an American football fullback who played two seasons with the Philadelphia Eagles of the National Football League. He was drafted by the Philadelphia Eagles in the 28th round of the 1952 NFL Draft. He played college football at the University of Louisville and attended Iaeger High School in Iaeger, West Virginia.

References

External links
Just Sports Stats

1928 births
1983 deaths
Players of American football from West Virginia
American football fullbacks
Louisville Cardinals football players
Philadelphia Eagles players
People from McDowell County, West Virginia